Butler College is an Independent public co-educational  high day school located in Butler, a northern suburb of Perth, Western Australia. Ryan Govan has been principal since August of 2022.

Background
Butler College opened at the beginning of 2013 as an Independent Public School. It is situated in one of the fastest growing areas of Perth, with student numbers rapidly increasing since it opened. Alkimos College opened to year 7 students in 2020 to take pressure off Butler College. Another secondary school is planned to be built in Alkimos by 2024.

Academic results

Student numbers

List of principals of Butler College

See also

 List of schools in the Perth metropolitan area

References

Public high schools in Perth, Western Australia
Educational institutions established in 2013
2013 establishments in Australia